Piero de Bonzi (also Pierre; 15 April 1631 - 11 July 1703) was an Italian-French Roman Catholic cardinal. His last name is also listed as Bonsi.

Biography

Born in Florence, he was the son of Francesco Bonzi, senator of Florence, and Cristina Riari. He was also grand-nephew of Cardinal Jean de Bonsi.

He was educated by his uncle Clément Bonzi, bishop of Béziers, who made him join the ecclesiastical state and he became  Resident of Ferdinando II de' Medici, Grand Duke of Tuscany in the French court. Later he was appointed commendatory abbot of several abbeys in France.

Piere de Bonzi was elected bishop of Béziers on 7 June 1660, the 5th member of the family to become bishop of that see. Later he became French ambassador in different countries in Europe. On 28 September 1671 he was promoted to the metropolitan see of Toulouse.

In 1672 Bonzi was created cardinal priest by Pope Clement X, and transferred to the metropolitan see of Narbonne two years later. He participated in the Papal conclaves of 1676, 1689 and 1691.  He opted for the title of Sant'Onofrio on 19 October 1676. Then he was transferred to the title of S. Pietro in Vincoli and later opted for the title of Sant'Eusebio. From about 1693, he suffered from epilepsy and because of poor health did not participate in the Papal conclave of 1700.

He died on 11 July 1703 of an apoplexy, in Montpellier.

References

 

1631 births
1703 deaths
Clergy from Florence
17th-century Roman Catholic archbishops in France
Bishops of Béziers
Archbishops of Narbonne
Archbishops of Toulouse
17th-century Italian cardinals
Italian emigrants to France
17th-century French diplomats